William Somerset, 3rd Earl of Worcester, KG (c. 1526/1527 – 21 February 1589) was an English courtier, nobleman, and politician. He was the eldest son of Henry Somerset, 2nd Earl of Worcester and his second wife Elizabeth Browne.

Earl of Worcester 
On 26 November 1549, he succeeded his father and became the 3rd Earl of Worcester.

Worcester supported Lady Jane Grey in 1553. He was invested as Knight, Order of the Garter (K.G.) in 1570. He was a patron of the arts, and sponsored - among others - the Elizabethan actor Edward Alleyn.

Marriages and children 
Before 19 May 1550, Worcester married Christiana North, daughter of Edward North, 1st Baron North and his wife Alice Squire. They were parents to three children:
Edward Somerset, 4th Earl of Worcester (d. 3 March 1628).
Elizabeth Somerset. Married William Windsor. He was a namesake son of William Windsor, 2nd Baron Windsor by his wife Margaret Sambourne.
Lucy Somerset. Married Henry Herbert, Esquire.

William Somerset re-married (2nd) before 1567 Theophila Newton, daughter of John Newton (otherwise Cradock), Knt., of East Harptree, Somerset, by Margaret, daughter of Anthony Poyntz, Knt. A portrait of Countess Theophila by an unknown artist of that date is mentioned by Ashelford, Visual History of Costume (1983): 72.

Death 
William Somerset died at his house Hackney on 21 February 1589 and was buried in the Church of St Cadoc, Raglan, Monmouthshire.

Ancestry

Notes

External links

Knights of the Garter
03
05
1520s births
1589 deaths
Somerset family
16th-century English nobility